Olayeni Fashina Abiodun (born 10 October 1990 in Lagos, Nigeria) is a Nigerian footballer who is last known to have played for Heartland FC of the Nigeria Professional Football League.

Career
Donning Swazi team Malanti Chiefs' colors in 2008/09, Fashina left the club to CSSC of the Mauritian Premier League when he was still registered with them and without international clearance, leaving coach Dumsani Gimedze annoyed. Gimedze stated that before going to Mauritius, Fashina sent him a letter, fabricating that he was trialling for a French club and stopping in Mauritius only to get a visa. As a consequence, Gimedze messaged the Confederation of African Football to notify them about the incident, turning down an offer from CSSC amounting 70000 Swazi lilangenis to legally buy the player which resulted in Fashina being dropped from CSSC's squad. Despite this, however, the Nigerian returned to ply his trade with them in 2010, signing with CSM Jiul Petroșani of the Romanian Fourth Division until the end of the 2010-11 season after a two-week trial with FC Astra Giurgiu. There, he stated his ambition to play in a higher level of the Romanian football league system, netting three goals in his first 7 games. Next, the striker moved to another Romanian team, Flacăra Făget, in 2013, but was assaulted by their director after being stubborn in leaving the club.

Personal life
Fashina is a practicer of Islam.

References

External links
 at ZeroZero

Nigerian expatriate footballers
1990 births
Living people
Association football forwards
Expatriate footballers in Hungary
Expatriate footballers in Romania
Expatriate footballers in Mauritius
Expatriate footballers in Eswatini
Mbabane Swallows players
Heartland F.C. players
Nigerian footballers
Nigerian expatriate sportspeople in Mauritius
Nigerian expatriate sportspeople in Eswatini
Nigerian expatriate sportspeople in Romania
Nigerian expatriate sportspeople in Hungary